Péter Niedermüller (born 3 September 1952) is a Hungarian politician. From July 2014 to July 2019, he served as a Member of the European Parliament, representing Hungary for the Democratic Coalition. In the 2019 Hungarian local elections, he was elected as the Mayor of Erzsébetváros as the joint candidate of the opposition (MSZP-P-DK-LMP-Momentum)(with external support of Jobbik)

Niedermüller also served as the Treasurer of the Group of the Progressive Alliance of Socialists and Democrats in the European Parliament.

Parliamentary service
Member, Committee on Civil Liberties, Justice and Home Affairs (2014–2019)
Member, Delegation for relations with Israel (2014–2019)

References

1952 births
Living people
Democratic Coalition (Hungary) MEPs
MEPs for Hungary 2014–2019
Politicians from Budapest